Alexander Stewart was a Scottish footballer who played as a goalkeeper. His longest spell was with Falkirk (winning the Scottish Cup with the Bairns in 1913), with other clubs including Partick Thistle, St Johnstone and Arbroath.

He was selected once for the Scottish Football League XI in 1919 while at Partick Thistle, having featured for the Scotland Junior international team in 1908 which helped to launch his career. On both occasions, his team were well beaten by their English opponents but Stewart was praised for his performance.

After retiring from playing he maintained an interest in sport: playing golf, owning a snooker and billiards hall in his hometown of Perth and introducing indoor lawn bowls greens to Arbroath.

Stewart's son, also named Alex, was also a footballer who played as a forward and was also capped once by the SFL XI.

References

Scottish footballers
Year of birth missing
Year of death missing
Association football goalkeepers
Footballers from Perth, Scotland
Scottish Football League players
Scottish Junior Football Association players
Falkirk F.C. players
Heart of Midlothian F.C. players
St Johnstone F.C. players
Partick Thistle F.C. players
Arbroath F.C. players
Cowdenbeath F.C. players
Scotland junior international footballers
Scottish Football League representative players